Abuya Kyai Hajji Uci Turtusi bin Dimyati, better known as Abuya Uci (died April 6, 2021), was an influential Indonesian Muslim cleric and preacher from Banten. Uci was the leader of the Pondok Pesantren Salafiyah Al-Istiqlaliyah Cilongok (Al-Istiqlaliyah Cilongok Islamic Boarding School or Pesantren Cilongok) who succeeded his father, Abuya Dimyati bin Romli, who died in early 2001. The Pesantren was founded in 1957 by Abuya Dimyati, an influential cleric in the Tangerang Regency.

Uci was known as a cleric who was close to former Indonesian President Abdurrahman Wahid (Gus Dur), he often mentioned Gus Dur's name in each of his religious lectures when discussing the essence of Islam and often told some of his privileges as a Muslim cleric who became president. In addition, Uci is also known to be close to another influential Indonesian Muslim cleric such as Habib Muhammad Luthfi bin Yahya.

Uci was a spiritual teacher for incumbent Banten governor, Wahidin Halim. He was one of the figures who supported Wahidin Halim and Andika Hazrumy to be the governor and deputy governor of Banten for the 2017–2022 period in 2017 Banten gubernatorial election.

Footnotes

References

External links

 Uci Turtusi official website

2021 deaths
Indonesian Islamic religious leaders
Nahdlatul Ulama
Sunni Muslim scholars of Islam
People from Tangerang
1964 births